The Rouyn-Noranda Huskies are a junior ice hockey team in the Quebec Major Junior Hockey League based in Rouyn-Noranda, Quebec, Canada.  The team plays its home games at the Aréna Glencore. The Huskies finished first overall in the QMJHL, during the 2007–08, 2015–16 and 2018–19 seasons, winning the Jean Rougeau Trophy. The team has won two President's Cups, and represented the QMJHL at the 2016 Memorial Cup, and as the 2019 Memorial Cup winners.

History

The Rouyn-Noranda franchise started out as the Montreal Junior Canadiens. While in Montreal, the team won three Memorial Cups in 1950, 1969 and 1970. The team has since played in Verdun and Saint-Hyacinthe.

On April 25, 1996, Sylvain Danis and Dave Morin, then owners of the Saint-Hyacinthe Laser, decided to transfer the team to Rouyn-Noranda. Aware that the "National Capital of Copper" is a city which breathes hockey, they were confident that it was the best decision for the franchise. Former NHL Hall of Famers from the area include Dave Keon and Jacques Laperrière.

The Huskies name was chosen to represent the tough and determined nature of the local citizens and mining community. The team is currently owned entirely by local interests and all the decisions of the sixteen shareholders are made in the interest of the team and the city which it represents.

Since 1996, the Huskies have won five regular season division titles, in 1998, 2005, 2008, 2010 and 2016. Rouyn-Noranda finished first overall in the QMJHL in 2007–08 winning its first Jean Rougeau Trophy, posting 97 points in the regular season. The 2015-16 season marked the team's 20th anniversary and they posted their best record in franchise history finishing first in the QMJHL with a franchise record 113 points. The team won its first President's Cup since relocating to Rouyn-Noranda in 2016.

The team won its second President's Cup in the 2018-19 season, and went on to win the 2019 Memorial Cup. Mario Pouliot retired from his positions for health reasons on May 25, 2021. In three seasons with the Huskies, he led the team to 113 victories combined in the regular seasons and playoffs.

Coaches
 Charles Thiffault (1996–1997)
 Jean Pronovost (1997–2001)
 Bob Mongrain (2001–2003)
 André Tourigny (2003–2013)
 Gilles Bouchard (2013–2018)
 Mario Pouliot (2018–2021)
 Brad Yetman (2021–present)

Awards

George Parsons Trophy(Most Sportsmanlike at the Memorial Cup) 
2015-16 Francis Perron

Jean Béliveau Trophy(Top Scorer) 
1998–99 Mike Ribeiro
2018-19 Peter Abbandonato

RDS Cup(Rookie of the year) 
1997–98 Mike Ribeiro

Michel Bergeron Trophy(Offensive Rookie of the Year) 
1997–98 Mike Ribeiro

Paul Dumont Trophy(Personality of the year) 
1997–98 Mike Ribeiro

Telus Cup – Offensive(Offensive player of the year)
1997–98 Pierre Dagenais
1998–99 James Desmarais

Telus Cup – Defensive(Defensive player of the year) 
2000–01 Maxime Ouellet

Marcel Robert Trophy(Scholastic player of the year) 
2002–03 Éric L'Italien

Players

NHL alumni

Sven Andrighetto
Jean-Christophe Beaudin
Alexandre Bolduc
Marc-André Bourdon
Mathieu Carle
Jordan Caron
Sébastien Centomo
Patrice Cormier
Philippe Cornet
Pierre Dagenais
Jean-Sébastien Dea
Guillaume Desbiens
Nicolas Deslauriers
Noah Dobson
William Dufour
Pascal Dupuis
Philippe Dupuis
Alexandre Fortin
Alexandre Giroux
A.J. Greer
Rafaël Harvey-Pinard
Nikita Kucherov
Jakub Lauko
Jérémy Lauzon
Guillaume Lefebvre
Maxime Macenauer
Olivier Magnan
Timo Meier
Philippe Myers
Liam O'Brien
Maxime Ouellet
Mike Ribeiro
Rémi Royer
Maxime Talbot
Ivan Vishnevskiy

Yearly results

Regular season

Legend: OTL = Overtime loss, SL = Shootout loss

Playoffs

Memorial Cup
2015-16 Finished round-robin portion of Memorial Cup in 3rd place with 1-2 record. Defeated Red Deer Rebels 3-1 in semi-final. Lost to London Knights 3-2 in final. Finished 2nd place in Memorial Cup.

2018-19 Finished round-robin portion of Memorial Cup in 3rd place with 2-1 record. Defeated Guelph Storm 6-4 in semi-final. Defeated the Halifax Mooseheads 4-2 in the final. Won Memorial Cup.

References

External links
 Huskies official website 

Quebec Major Junior Hockey League teams
Ice hockey teams in Quebec
Sport in Rouyn-Noranda
Ice hockey clubs established in 1933
Ice hockey clubs established in 1954
Ice hockey clubs established in 1975
1933 establishments in Quebec
1954 establishments in Quebec
1975 establishments in Quebec